Qaraçala (also, Karachala and Karachalinskaya) is a village and municipality in the Salyan Rayon of Azerbaijan.  It has a population of 5,071.  The municipality consists of the villages of Qaraçala and Şatrovka.

References 

Populated places in Salyan District (Azerbaijan)